Nikita Vasilyevich Razdorskikh (born 13 January 2000) is a Russian football player who plays for FC Yenisey Krasnoyarsk.

Club career
He made his debut in the Russian Professional Football League for FC Dynamo Barnaul on 7 September 2017 in a game against FC Zenit Irkutsk.

He made his Russian Football National League debut for FC Yenisey Krasnoyarsk on 7 July 2019 in a game against FC Tekstilshchik Ivanovo.

References

External links
 Profile by Russian Professional Football League

2000 births
Sportspeople from Barnaul
Living people
Russian footballers
Association football midfielders
FC Dynamo Barnaul players
FC Yenisey Krasnoyarsk players
Russian First League players
Russian Second League players